Bradyrhizobium betae is a species of legume-root nodulating, microsymbiotic nitrogen-fixing bacterium first isolated from the roots of Beta vulgaris, hence its name. It is slow-growing an endophytic. The type strain is PL7HG1T (=LMG 21987T =CECT 5829T).

References

Further reading

Polacco, Joe C., and Christopher D. Todd. Ecological Aspects of Nitrogen Metabolism in Plants. John Wiley & Sons, 2011.

External links
LPSN

Type strain of Bradyrhizobium betae at BacDive -  the Bacterial Diversity Metadatabase

Nitrobacteraceae
Bacteria described in 2004